Summit Township is a township in Butler County, Pennsylvania, United States. The population was 4,884 at the 2010 census.

Geography
Summit Township is located in east-central Butler County, just east of the city of Butler, the county seat. The township surrounds the borough of East Butler but is a separate entity. The unincorporated communities of Herman, Brinker, Vogleyville, Bonnie Brook, Wadsworth, and Carbon Center are located in the township.

U.S. Route 422, the Benjamin Franklin Highway, crosses the township, connecting Butler to the west with Kittanning to the east.

Demographics

As of the census of 2000, there were 4,728 people, 1,682 households, and 1,269 families residing in the township.  The population density was 212.1 people per square mile (81.9/km).  There were 1,755 housing units at an average density of 78.7/sq mi (30.4/km).  The racial makeup of the township was 95.43% White, 3.98% African American, 0.02% Native American, 0.21% Asian, 0.02% from other races, and 0.34% from two or more races. Hispanic or Latino of any race were 0.78% of the population.

There were 1,682 households, out of which 32.0% had children under the age of 18 living with them, 63.4% were married couples living together, 8.0% had a female householder with no husband present, and 24.5% were non-families. 20.7% of all households were made up of individuals, and 8.0% had someone living alone who was 65 years of age or older.  The average household size was 2.62 and the average family size was 3.04.

In the township the population was spread out, with 28.3% under the age of 18, 7.5% from 18 to 24, 28.9% from 25 to 44, 22.7% from 45 to 64, and 12.6% who were 65 years of age or older.  The median age was 36 years. For every 100 females, there were 115.6 males.  For every 100 females age 18 and over, there were 100.8 males.

The median income for a household in the township was $39,385, and the median income for a family was $45,696. Males had a median income of $31,502 versus $19,597 for females. The per capita income for the township was $14,996.  About 10.5% of families and 14.5% of the population were below the poverty line, including 21.9% of those under age 18 and 12.2% of those age 65 or over.

References

External links
Summit Township official website

Populated places established in 1796
Pittsburgh metropolitan area
Townships in Butler County, Pennsylvania
Townships in Pennsylvania
1854 establishments in Pennsylvania